Moriwaki is a Japanese surname. Notable people with the surname include:

, Japanese photographer
, Japanese baseball player
, Japanese comedian and radio personality
, Japanese anime director
Mamoru Moriwaki, Japanese motorcycle designer and tuner
, Japanese footballer
, Japanese motorcycle racer
, Japanese judoka
, Japanese diarist
, Japanese sport wrestler

Japanese-language surnames